Alexandr Chervyakov (born in Kokshetau on ) is a Kazakh biathlete.

He competed in the 2006 and 2010 Winter Olympics for Kazakhstan. His best finish was 18th, as a member of the Kazakh relay team in 2010. His best individual performance was 49th, in the 2010 pursuit.

As of February 2013, his best performance at the Biathlon World Championships is 15th, in the 2009 mixed relay and the 2012 men's relay. His best individual performance in a World Championships is 28th, in the 2008 individual.

As of February 2013, his best finish in a Biathlon World Cup is 11th, again in a mixed relay, at Pyeongchang in 2007/08. His best individual finish is 27th, in an individual race at Torino in 2004/05. His best overall finish is from 2009/10, placing 61st.

References 

1980 births
Biathletes at the 2006 Winter Olympics
Biathletes at the 2010 Winter Olympics
Kazakhstani male biathletes
Living people
Olympic biathletes of Kazakhstan
Sportspeople from Kokshetau
People from Kokshetau
Asian Games medalists in biathlon
Biathletes at the 2007 Asian Winter Games
Biathletes at the 2011 Asian Winter Games
Asian Games gold medalists for Kazakhstan
Asian Games bronze medalists for Kazakhstan
Medalists at the 2007 Asian Winter Games
Medalists at the 2011 Asian Winter Games
21st-century Kazakhstani people